Gigafactory Texas (also known as Giga Texas or Gigafactory 5) is an automotive manufacturing facility near Austin, Texas built by Tesla, Inc. Construction began in July 2020, limited production of Model Y began before the end of 2021, and initial deliveries of vehicles built at the factory took place at an opening party called “Cyber Rodeo” on April 7, 2022.

The factory is also planned to be the main factory for the Tesla Cybertruck and the Tesla Semi, and produces Model Y cars for the Eastern United States. It also serves as the site of Tesla's corporate headquarters. It is the country's second biggest factory by size as well as the second-largest building by volume in the world after the Boeing Everett Factory.

History

Selection process 
Tesla had been considering locations across eight states in the central United States during 2019‒2020.

Community groups and government officials in several areas of the US expressed interest in hosting what was expected to be a very large Tesla Gigafactory manufacturing facility. Some expressing interest in facilitating land procurement, getting over the regulatory obstacles, and considering potential tax incentives.  Some used social media marketing aiming to reach Elon Musk directly.

By May 2020, a selection process was underway by Tesla.  The short list included Austin, Nashville (Tennessee) and Tulsa (Oklahoma).  Two locations in the vicinity of Tulsa had been viewed by Tesla by mid-May.  The Tulsa campaign was promoted by G. T. Bynum, the mayor of Tulsa. In May 2020 Bynum discussed the suitability of "Green Country" (Northeastern Oklahoma) and distributed a photomontage of the Cybertruck in Tulsa Police Department livery, with a suggestion of local purchasing, if the Gigafactory were to be situated near Tulsa. On May 20, 2020, wrap advertising was applied to the Golden Driller statue located at the Tulsa Expo Center to create a caricature of Elon Musk, with the word "Tulsa" on statue's belt buckle replaced by the "Tesla" name.

In July 2020, Tesla selected Austin as the site.

Austin 
In 2014, Tesla evaluated a  manufacturing site on U.S. Route 79 at Frame Switch, located between the towns of Hutto and Taylor, north-east of the Greater Austin center as its next factory.

Tesla subsequently chose to construct Giga Nevada (formerly Gigafactory 1) in Nevada in 2014.

By June 2020, a different location near Austin was being considered.  It is a  site bordering Harold Green Road ( now Tesla Rd) and Texas State Highway 130. On June 16, 2020 the Commissioners' court of Travis County discussed a possible incentives package for Tesla. In July 2020, the Del Valle Independent School District approved a tax incentives package worth $68 million, should the Tesla Gigafactory be built.

On July 22, 2020, during a 2Q2020 earnings call, Tesla announced that Del Valle, Austin, Texas had been selected for Gigafactory 5.

By the end of July 2020, construction had begun.  The Tesla Gigafactory received state tax incentives worth about $50 million through the Texas Tax Code Chapter 313 program.

The first fully completed Tesla Model Y rolled off the line at Giga Texas in the last week of August 2021 under trial production.

Tesla announced a manufacturing training program in cooperation with Austin Community College District on June 15, 2021.  The program was expected to start in August 2021 and the course was to last 14 weeks.

In December 2021, Elon Musk estimated that Giga Texas will require a total investment of at least $10B and may employ as much as 20,000 employees within the company. Observers have spotted production cars in and outside of the factory.

As of March 2022, Tesla battery manufacturers CATL and Panasonic are scouting sites for battery factories in the US, including Kansas and Oklahoma (which are within close proximity of Giga Texas), Mexico and Canada. 

The State of Kansas and Panasonic announced in July 2022 that a Battery Factory location had been selected in De Soto, KS (at former Sunflower Army Ammunition facility).  Huge subsidies ($1 billion) and abatements were granted to Panasonic organized by Governor Laura Kelly (D).

Equipment

Die casting 

During the night of January 18/19, 2021, concrete foundations for three Giga Press high-press die-casting machines were poured at the north-east corner Giga Texas factory location.

On January 21, 2021 the first Giga Press components started to arrive on site in crates and shipping containers.
On January 22, 2021 the base frame of the first Giga Press was unboxed and craned into position.

See also 
 List of Tesla factories

References

External links 

 Project 2020-115336 SP plans, at Austin Build + Connect

Youtube update channels 
 Weekly updates with building construction progress statistics
 daily drone footage of construction

5
Manufacturing plants in the United States
Motor vehicle assembly plants in Texas
Texas, Giga